Humsafar is a 2011 Pakistani drama telenovela based on the novel of the same name by Farhat Ishtiaq (who also wrote the screenplay), and directed by Sarmad Sultan Khoosat. It stars Fawad Khan, Mahira Khan, Naveen Waqar along with Atiqa Odho, and Hina Khawaja Bayat in supporting roles.

Humsafar become the most successful program of the channel to date, earning it widespread acclaim and international recognition. Due to its success, critics referred to this era of Pakistani television as a "Golden Age". It was claimed highest rated serial at that time in Pakistan with the TRPs of 9.71, peaking at 11.9 trps.

Plot
Khirad Ahsaan belongs to a small middle-class community in Hyderabad and lives with her widowed mother, Maimoona, in a small apartment. As the series opens, she has recently completed her Bachelor of Science degree, and (as her late father was a math teacher) is very strong in mathematics. Maimoona's brother, Baseerat Hussain, is a self-made millionaire who lives in Karachi. He is married to Farida, a social worker who runs a human rights NGO. They have one son, Ashar, who received his MBA from Yale University, and runs the family's high-powered firm with his father.

After Maimoona receives a cancer diagnosis,  Baseerat then brings her and Khirad to his large home in Karachi for treatment. When she realizes that there is no cure, Maimoona asks Baseerat to arrange a marriage for Khirad. Feeling guilty for not taking better care of Maimoona, Baseerat compensates by promising that Ashar will marry Khirad, unbeknownst to Farida, Khirad, or Ashar. Farida is opposed to the match until Baseerat threatens to throw her out of the house if she does not accept it. While initially opposed, Ashar is then manipulated by his father to accept the marriage, as is Khirad by her mother. Meanwhile, Sara (who is in love with Ashar) attempts suicide after both learning about the match and hearing from Ashar that he only sees her as a friend. After he rescues her, she promises to move on.  Despite being against the idea, Ashar and Khirad get married in a home ceremony. Within a short period of time, Maimoona dies, and Farida appears to have had a change in heart, treating Khirad as a daughter.

After an initial period of complications, Ashar and Khirad eventually find themselves deeply in love with each other. After Baseerat's sudden death, and encouraged by Ashar to follow her dreams, Khirad enrols in a master's program in applied mathematics. Shortly after joining the program, she discovers that one of her classmates (Khizer) is Sara's paternal first cousin. Ashar becomes secretly jealous of both this friendship and of Khirad's involvement with the school, and her success there. She and Farida also learn that Khirad is pregnant, but decide to keep it as a surprise for Ashar.

However, Khirad never has the opportunity to tell him the news, because she is framed by Khizar, Farida, and Zarina. Khirad learns that the love and attention from Farida, Zarina, and Khizar was a facade that hid a complex conspiracy. Farida feels that because Khirad had a middle-class upbringing she is beneath Ashar. Zarina hopes that Sara will stop obsessing over Ashar's marriage to Khirad. Farida made a deal with Khizar to pay for his graduate studies in the United States and a marriage to Sara, unbeknownst to Sara and Zarina. With Baseerat gone, Farida (who never forgave him for threatening to throw her out) can convince Ashar that Khirad and Khizar were having an affair, despite her pleas of innocence. Unable to bear the idea (and not willing to hear Khirad's side of the story), Ashar disappears. Farida uses his absence as an opportunity to further develop the fabrication and throw Khirad out of the house (as an act of revenge against Baseerat) in the middle of the night. Khirad is able to quickly write a note to Ashar proclaiming her innocence and leaves it with a member of the house staff. She is then taken to Hyderabad by a good samaritan, and finds a home with her former neighbour, Batool Bano. As Farida told Ashar that Khirad ran away with Khizar, Ashar refused Khirad's multiple calls. Thus, she realizes that she will never be able to convince him of her innocence, and gives up on their marriage. She gives birth alone to a premature baby and decides that she will raise Hareem on her own, working as a math teacher.

Four years later, driven by Hareem's need for open heart surgery, Khirad confronts Ashar. Her youthful innocence and fear of the world have now been both replaced by a firm and courageous persona that allows her to stand up to Ashar. She has also learned how to protect herself with documentation, evidence that forces Ashar to accept the reality that Hareem (whom he did not know existed) is his daughter. He brings them both back home during the medical procedures. Khirad is then forced to confront both Sara and Farida, but the strength, independence, and confidence born of her hardships prevent them from bullying her.

Sara confesses her love to Ashar once again, but he informs her that he cannot love anyone and that she should stop pursuing him. Khizar also returns from America and starts to blackmail Farida by threatening to reveal Khirad's innocence to Ashar if Sara does not marry him. Under pressure, Farida visits Sara and urges her to marry Khizar, but Sara and her mother Zarina refuse. Distraught, Sara attempts suicide again, and this time she succeeds.

After Hareem's successful operation, Khirad secretly returns to Hyderabad and leaves Hareem with Ashar (telling him through a letter that he has full custody because she is not financially capable of taking care of her). However, the period with Khirad had rekindled Asher's feelings for her. While looking through a box of albums, Ashar finds Khirad's letter from four years earlier and finally reads it for the first time. The truth of the letter overwhelms him as he realizes he committed a terrible mistake in believing the scene from four years before. He then overhears a phone call between Farida and Khizar, which confirms that what he saw was a fabrication and that Farida deliberately threw Khirad out to disavow the unborn child.

Horrified by the reality of his unintentional complicity with the conspiracy against Khirad, he flees to Hyderabad to beg her forgiveness. He manages to convince Khirad to return home, where they face Farida. In his absence, Farida had found the letter, and thus upon seeing them both, begins to repeat her series of lies. However, this time, Ashar stands up to her, perhaps for the first time in his life. He rejects Farida's narrative, proclaims Khirad's innocence, and states that she belongs in this home with his daughter (whom Farida also attempted to disavow). Farida becomes so frightened by Ashar's decision to support Khirad that she has a nervous breakdown, and loses all connection with reality. Ashar then takes full responsibility for all of the events and begs Khirad to stay in the home. Khirad is hesitant, stating that she is a different person now and that she isn't certain she can love him as she used to. She also wonders how Ashar could have imagined she was capable of the narrative fabricated about her, and how he could have abandoned her if he genuinely loved her. Deeply ashamed, Ashar agrees, and states that it was entirely his fault and that he has no right to expect she can ever forgive him. However, he hopes that she will stay so that they can raise Hareem together. Khirad reluctantly consents to the arrangement, and a few months later, the three are shown as a real family unit.

Cast
 Fawad Khan as Ashar Hussain
 Mahira Khan as Khirad Ashar Hussain (Nee'Ahsaan)
 Naveen Waqar as Sara Ajmal
 Atiqa Odho as Farida Hussain
 Behroze Sabzwari as Baseerat Hussain
 Hina Khawaja Bayat as Zarina Ajmal
 Noor Hassan Rizvi as Khizar
 Saba Faisal as Maimoona Ahsaan 
Salma Zafar as Sherish
Shahbaz Rajput as Ali
Qaiser Naqvi as Batool Bano
 Sara Kashif as Hareem Hussain

Guest Appearances
 Khalid Anam as Khirad's father
 Mansha Pasha as the wife of Ashar's friend
 Kanwar Arsalan as Raza, Ashar's colleague
 Kanwar Atiq ur Rehman as Umar, Ashar's colleague
 Sarmad Khoosat as Dr. Idrees, Khirad's Professor

Deviations from the novel

Although author Farhat Ishtiaq adapted the screenplay from her novel,  Humsafar, there are differences between the two. While the novel is written from Hareem's perspective, the serial  focuses on Khirad and Asher. In the novel, Ashar is the brother of two sisters, while in the drama he has no siblings. In the novel, Sara is a minor character who is never close to Asher, becomes mentally ill and is hospitalized. In the serial, Sara is a main character who loves Ashar, is the love interest of Khizar, and dies at the end. In the novel, Khizar loves a girl named Mehreen and never returns from America.

Khirad and Maimoona reside in Nawabshah in the novel, while  the serial's location is in Hyderabad. 
 
While the drama ends with the Farida's nervous breakdown and Ashar and Khirad's slow reconciliation, the novel ends with Asher begging Khirad to take him back, and Khirad falling into his arms.

Soundtrack

The show's theme song Woh Humsafar Tha was composed by Waqar Ali and sung by Qurat-ul-Ain Balouch. Naseer Turabi wrote the poem to express his sorrow after the fall of Dhaka (marking the end of the Indo-Pakistani War of 1971). It serves as both the song for the title sequence, as well as background music during each episode.

Production

Development
Humsafar’s producer Momina Duraid, notes that its development was somewhat serendipitous. Duraid was working with author Farhat Ishtiaq on another of her works, when she suggested Humsafar as a potential project (due to the fact that Duraid had just read “and thoroughly enjoyed” the novel). Ishtiaq then told her that Humsafar “had already been declined by two production houses,” to which Duraid responded: “If I can feel it," then the "public can feel it as well.”

Ishtiaq states that when she first started working on the novel, she "wanted to understand if the idea of love is complete without trust." Although she wrote the screenplay for Humsafar, she notes that the novel is different from the television series, as "the former is more about the child, while the show concentrates on the parents as lovers."

Reception

Release
Humsafar had a large impact on Pakistan's television industry (which had previously been dominated by Indian Television). It was an enormously popular show during its national television run, was extensively discussed in social media, and by 2014 was the highest-rated Pakistani series to date. The series also had a large global audience. Star reported that the Humsafar page on Facebook had thousands of Pakistani origin European and North American fans and viewers. Many said that although they had never watched a Pakistani drama before, they are now completely hooked on Humsafar.

Critical reception
Many stated that the series led to a new phase in Urdu drama. Others argued that the series upheld misogyny and was regressive in its tendency to fall into stereotype. Finally, some critics offered a middle ground, suggesting that the popularity of the series was due to a narrative that was both entrenched in patriarchy, but also a critical response to it, offering characters and plot lines that reflected a degree of reality.

Human rights activist Abira Ashfaq criticized the plot for being overly simplistic and reliant on patriarchal cliches, with the primary female character lacking complexity and agency. On the other hand, less passive female characters were cast as the villains. Ashfaq notes that “the terrible appeal of Humsafar, is that it confirms characters and stories set in deeply patriarchal frameworks. It is sexist justice that soothes the hearts of patriarchal vigilantes, and keeps us on because we want to see the mother-in-law shamed, humiliated and thrust out, and moral purity rise to the top in the reunion of Khirad and Ashar.” Kanika Rajani of The Indian Express argues that the series is unique in its decision to portray its protagonists as flawed, particularly "Asher’s frustration at his initial failed attempts to communicate with his wife." Amna Ali, meanwhile, criticized the plot for its use of cliches, such as casting the mother-in-law as the villain and portraying Sara, a westernized girl who wore jeans, in a negative light in contrast to the more traditional Khirad.

Response to Khirad

Mahira Khan's portrayal of "Khirad" received positive feedback from critics and was popular with viewers when the serial debuted. To those who called Khirad a "downtrodden woman," Khan argued, "no she was not. Go back and look at it, and there is a reason why she was not, because the slap was removed from it, there were things that were removed and there were things that were brought in just to show that she had a spine." Khan further states that, "Khirad is closest to my heart. We have a lot of crying women in serials. But despite going through so much hardship, Khirad is so dignified." Later, in September 2020, Khan reflected on Humsafar, stating that "Khirad is by far my most special character. She loved fiercely, she gave whole heartedly and when it came to her self respect she held that closest to her heart. What a woman."

Promotion
Hum TV gave the show its Hum Honorary Phenomenal Serial Award.

Awards and nominations

References

External links 
 
Humsafar Trailer (with title song) - HUM Music/Hum Network
#10YearsofHumsafar: Mahira eternally grateful for Khirad (September 25, 2021)

Farhat Ishtiaq
Hum TV
Hum Network Limited
Hum TV original programming
Pakistani romantic drama television series
Television series set in Punjab, Pakistan
Television series about bullying
Television series based on the novels of Farhat Ishtiaq
Television series created by Momina Duraid
Television series by MD Productions
Urdu-language telenovelas
Pakistani telenovelas
Zee Zindagi original programming
Hum Sitaray